South calls North (ScN) is a regionalist and populist political party in Italy, mainly active in Sicily, founded by the former mayor of Messina, Cateno De Luca.

History
On 25 June 2022, in the run-up to the Sicilian regional election, former mayor of Messina Cateno De Luca, along with former Five Star Movement MEP Dino Giarrusso, launched their own movement "South calls North". However, after a few weeks, Giarrusso left the party due to conflicts with De Luca with regard to the party's candidatures in the following election; thus, De Luca remained the only leader of the movement. 

South calls North took part in the Italian general election held on 25 September 2022, winning one single-member constituency in the Chamber of Deputies with Francesco Gallo, and one in the Senate of the Republic with Dafne Musolino, both from the districts of Messina, where ScN was capable to collect more than 30% of votes. On the same day, De Luca run as president of Sicily in the regional election, arriving at the second place, with 25% of votes, behind the centre-right candidate Renato Schifani. The party received 13.6% of votes, electing eight members of the regional assembly. Upon the formation of parliamentary groups, four councillors elected with ScN formed a distinct parliamentary group named Sicilia Vera (SV), De Luca's other party.

Ideology
The party has been described as regionalist, autonomist and populist. ScN also supports federalism, advocating for a greater administrative decentralization and greater decision-making power for local administrators. Moreover, the party is also in favor of increasing the powers of the Prime Minister of Italy, comparing this position to a "mayor of Italy", as it is clearly shown in the party's logo under the slogan "De Luca for Mayor of Italy".

Electoral results

Italian Parliament

Regional Councils

Symbols

References

See also
Sicilia Vera

2022 establishments in Italy
Regionalist parties in Italy
Political parties established in 2022